The 2011–12 Arizona Sundogs season was the sixth season of the Central Hockey League (CHL) franchise in Prescott Valley, Arizona.

Regular season

Conference standings

Awards and records

Awards

Milestones

Transactions
The Sundogs have been involved in the following transactions during the 2011–12 season.

Trades

Free agents acquired

Free agents lost

Players re-signed

Roster

See also
 2011–12 CHL season

References

External links

Arizona Sundogs
Arizona Sundogs